William Stark may refer to:

William Stark (loyalist) (1724–1776), older brother of Gen. John Stark, the hero of the Battle of Bennington
William Stark (architect) (1770–1813), Scottish architect and town planner 
William Ledyard Stark (1853–1922), Nebraska Populist politician
William Henry Stark (1851–1936), industrial leader whose contributions helped the city of Orange, Texas develop financially
William Stark (physician) (1742–1770), English physician and medical pioneer who investigated scurvy by experimenting on himself with fatal consequences
Billy Stark (born 1956), Scottish footballer

See also
Willie Stark, opera
William E. Starke (1814–1862), a general in the American Civil War